Nyx, in comics, may refer to:

Nyx (Image Comics), an Image Comics character from Spawn
NYX (comics), a Marvel Comics limited series
Nyx (Marvel Comics), a Marvel Comics supervillain

See also
NYX (disambiguation)